Captain Frederick Albert McLaren OBE (19 August 1874 – 23 September 1952) was an English first-class cricketer. McLaren was a fast-medium bowler, although which arm he bowled with is unknown.

In the years prior to the First World War, McLaren was a prominent bowler for the British Army.

McLaren made his first-class debut for Hampshire in 1908 against the Marylebone Cricket Club, where he took two wickets in the match. Later in 1908 McLaren played his second and final first-class match for Hampshire against the Gentlemen of Philadelphia, where he became one of Bart King's five victims in Hampshire's first innings. McLaren took two wickets in the match.

McLaren fought in World War I, serving in the Army Service Corps as a captain. 	

McLaren survived the war and in 1919 played a single match for the Europeans (India) against the Indians, where he took his final two first-class wickets.

McLaren died in at Dartford, Kent on 23 September 1952.

External links
Frederick McLaren at Cricinfo
Frederick McLaren at CricketArchive

1874 births
1952 deaths
People from Farnham
People from Surrey
English cricketers
Hampshire cricketers
Europeans cricketers
British Army personnel of World War I
Officers of the Order of the British Empire
Royal Army Service Corps officers